Hot Sulphur Springs is a statutory town and the county seat of Grand County, Colorado, United States.

History
Hot Sulphur Springs was originally a winter campground for Native Americans who came to use the hot springs for medicinal purposes. In 1840 William Newton Byers, founder of the Rocky Mountain News, was the first European American to document the springs. The town was established in 1860, making it the oldest town in the county, originally named "Saratoga West" and sometimes called "Warm Springs".

In 1863 the town site was bought by Byers in a backroom deal with a Minnesota Sioux woman despite a treaty naming the Ute tribe as the lawful owners, who unsuccessfully sued Byers, while Byers and territorial governors William Gilpin and John Evans launched a "The Utes Must Go" campaign with the help of the U.S. Cavalry. Wishing to create a world-famous spa and resort ("the American Switzerland"), Byers changed the name and surveyed, platted, and named the streets, attracting famous visitors including Zane Grey and John Wesley Powell. The first pool house was built ca. 1900.

When Grand County was formed, Hot Sulphur Springs was the first county seat from 1874 to 1882, after which it moved to Grand Lake. The county seat returned in 1888 and has been there ever since.

Byers died on March 25, 1903. The town was incorporated on April 1, 1903. His original family cabin is located at 204 Byers Avenue along what is now Highway 40. The building is currently the county's only mortuary.

The first winter carnival in Hot Sulphur Springs was held on December 31, 1911. The success of this event led to a three-day carnival which took place on February 10–12, 1912. The following winter, a second annual winter carnival was planned in conjunction with the first Steamboat Springs Winter Sports Carnival. This series of events led to the creation of Howelsen Hill Ski Area in Steamboat Springs, and is credited with playing a large role in the birth of the Colorado ski industry.

The big plans of Byers were prevented by the slow arrival of the railroad in 1928 (after the construction of the Moffat Tunnel), and eventually the railroad quit stopping there, although the town is still a resort attracting many visitors. The first lodging rooms opened in 1926.

In 1997 the resort was extensively renovated, and the Ute tribal spiritual leader blessed the waters at the opening ceremony, attended by almost 1,000, which welcomed the Utes to use the springs once again.

Payday was always the last day of the month and was considered a dangerous day because of the many gunfights that occurred. Because Halloween is October 31, the last day of the month, the people of the town celebrated Halloween on the 30th to keep children safe, which continues to the present day.

The Pioneer Village Museum is also located in Hot Sulphur Springs.

Geography
Hot Sulphur Springs is located in central Grand County at  (40.073318, -106.101470). It is located along the Colorado River, just east (upstream) of where the river enters Byers Canyon.

Climate
This climate type is dominated by the winter season, a long, bitterly cold period with short, clear days, relatively little precipitation mostly in the form of snow, and low humidity. According to the Köppen Climate Classification system, Hot Sulphur Springs has a subarctic climate, abbreviated "Dfc" on climate maps.

Demographics

As of the census of 2000, there were 521 people, 196 households, and 131 families residing in the town. The racial makeup of the town was 94.82% White, 0.38% African American, 1.92% Native American, 2.11% from other races, and 0.77% from two or more races. Hispanic or Latino of any race were 7.10% of the population.

There were 196 households, out of which 32.1% had children under the age of 18 living with them, 57.7% were married couples living together, 5.1% had a female householder with no husband present, and 32.7% were non-families. 25.5% of all households were made up of individuals, and 7.1% had someone living alone who was 65 years of age or older.  The average household size was 2.45 and the average family size was 2.98.

In the town, the population was spread out, with 24.4% under the age of 18, 9.0% from 18 to 24, 34.7% from 25 to 44, 25.7% from 45 to 64, and 6.1% who were 65 years of age or older.  The median age was 36 years. For every 100 females, there were 122.6 males.  For every 100 females age 18 and over, there were 134.5 males.

The median income for a household in the town was $39,306, and the median income for a family was $46,000. Males had a median income of $42,431 versus $20,208 for females. The per capita income for the town was $24,012.  About 2.3% of families and 5.7% of the population were below the poverty line, including 4.0% of those under age 18 and 9.1% of those age 65 or over.

Hot springs 

The natural thermal springs at Hot Sulphur Springs are located in just outside the town limits on the west side of the Colorado River. The natural hot springs are heated from geothermal activity. Historically, the indigenous Ute people used the springs, but as more European settlers, and American soldiers arrived in the area they were pushed out although the court system declared the Utes the rightful owners. In more recent years a resort has been built at the hot springs that offers several soaking pools and tubs with temperatures ranging from 98°F to 112°F.

Water profile
The hot mineral water emerges from the source at 125°F / 52°C at a rate of 200,000 gallons per day. The mineral content of the water consists of calcium (15ppm), chloride (145ppm), floride (11ppm), lithium (1.3ppm), magnesium (3.2ppm), potassium (24ppm), sodium (435ppm), sulfate (145ppm). Trace minerals include arsenic, iron, manganese and zinc.

See also

Outline of Colorado
Index of Colorado-related articles
State of Colorado
Colorado cities and towns
Colorado municipalities
Colorado counties
Grand County, Colorado
Arapaho National Forest

References

External links
Town of Hot Sulphur Springs official website
Hot Sulphur Springs Chamber of Commerce
Grand County Government
Pioneer Village Museum
CDOT map of the Town of Hot Sulphur Springs

Towns in Grand County, Colorado
Towns in Colorado
County seats in Colorado
Hot springs of Colorado
Spa towns in the United States